The 2014–15 Liga Națională was the 57th season of Romanian Women's Handball League, the top-level women's professional handball league. The league comprises fourteen teams. HCM Baia Mare were the defending champions.

Teams for 2014–15 

CSM București
HCM Baia Mare
Corona Braşov
SCM Craiova
Dunărea Brăila
HCM Râmnicu Vâlcea
Cetate Deva
CSM Ploieşti
HCM Roman
Universitatea Cluj-Napoca
HC Zalău
Neptun Constanţa
CSM Unirea Slobozia
SC Mureșul Târgu Mureș

Standings 

1. * CSM București was docked 1 point.

Liga Națională (women's handball)
2014 in Romanian women's sport
2015 in Romanian women's sport
2014–15 domestic handball leagues